Pantera Guillermo Mosquera (26 October 1964 – 4 December 2017), known professionally as La Pantera, was a professional boxer and a boxing trainer. During his professional boxing career, Mosquera fought in 9 different countries including Colombia, Italy, New Zealand, Australia and more. Mosquera won multiple credible titles including WBC International Super Lightweight Title, WBA – PABA Super Lightweight Title and the World Boxing Foundation World Super Lightweight Title. He started his professional career in Colombia but eventually Mosquera moved to Italy in the mid to late 1980s. In the 1990s, Mosquera moved to New Zealand where he eventually won the New Zealand national title in 2004. While in New Zealand, Mosquera started training boxers. His most notable boxer was Adrian Taihia while he was in The Contender Australia. Mosquera ended his career in Spain in 2012 where he lived in Valencia, Comunidad Valenciana. Mosquera lived the remainder of his life in Italy where he owned a boxing gym. In 2017, after a long battle, Mosquera died of cancer. He had his funeral at the church of the SS Annunziata in Via del Sole.

Boxing Titles
World Boxing Council
 International Super Lightweight Title (138¾ Ibs)
World Boxing Association
 Pan Asian Boxing Association Super Lightweight Title (139¾ Ibs)
New Zealand Boxing Association
 New Zealand National Super Lightweight Title (139 Ibs)
World Boxing Association
World Boxing Foundation
 World Super Lightweight Title (140 Ibs)

Professional boxing record

References

1964 births
2017 deaths
Colombian male boxers
People from Buenaventura, Valle del Cauca
Light-welterweight boxers
Deaths from cancer in Lazio
Sportspeople from Valle del Cauca Department